A homography may refer to
 homography, a type of isomorphism of projective spaces,
 homography (computer vision), a mapping relating perspective images of the same scene,
 homograph, a word written the same but with different meaning, or
 heterography and homography, a measure of phonetic consistency in language.